Pat Flowers is an American politician from Montana who has served a State Senator since 2019. He is a member of the Montana Democratic Party and represents District 32.

References

External links 
 Official website

21st-century American politicians
Democratic Party members of the Montana House of Representatives
Living people
People from Belgrade, Montana
Year of birth missing (living people)